Tomme de Savoie is an upland variety of Tomme cheese, specifically, one from Savoy in the French Alps. It is a mild, semi-firm cow's milk cheese with a beige interior and a thick brownish-grey rind. Tomme de Savoie dates back to ancient history.

Tomme de Savoie, like most Tommes, is usually made from the skim milk left over after the cream is used to make butter or richer cheeses. As a result, the cheese has a relatively low fat content (between 20 and 45%). The cheese is made year-round, and typically has a slightly different character depending on whether the cows are fed on winter hay or summer grass.

It is first pressed, and then matured for several months in a traditional cellar, producing the characteristically thick rind and flavor.

See also 
 List of ancient dishes and foods
 List of cheeses

References 

French cheeses
Cow's-milk cheeses
Ancient dishes
Arpitania